Dinner Date is a British dating game show, which first aired on ITV from 9 August 2010 to 28 December 2012, with subsequent new series airing on sister channel ITVBe since 8 October 2014. The programme makes up a significant proportion of ITVBe's output, with several repeats airing daily. New-to-air episodes are generally scheduled on a weekly basis, although some episodes from the fifth series were stripped daily across weeknights.

Premise
The show involves a man or woman guest going for dinner at three different people's houses on consecutive nights. The dates are chosen at the start of the episode, when the dater chooses their three blind dates by going through five different three-course menus. The hosts are shown preparing a meal, usually some kind of interesting dish, and then the guest arrives. Afterward each host gives ratings of the guest, but then it is up to the guest to subsequently choose which of them they would like to go on a date to a restaurant with. The two losing contestants are given ready meals. At the end of the show, the viewers are told whether they are still dating or not. Sometimes updates of the romantic lives of the two unpicked hosts are given as well.

International versions
The UK version of Dinner Date broadcasts in over 20 countries, including; Australia, Belgium, Bosnia, Denmark, Finland, Germany, Hong Kong and Taiwan, Hungary, Iceland, India, Ireland, Israel, Italy, Macedonia, Montenegro, Netherlands, New Zealand, Norway, Poland, South Africa, Serbia and Sweden.

There was also an Australian version of Dinner Date which aired on the Seven Network in 2011 hosted by Manu Feildel and a South African version of the show. Since 2020 there is also a German version of the show aired on ZDF Neo.

Transmissions

References

External links
 
 

2010 British television series debuts
2010s British reality television series
2010s British game shows
2020s British reality television series
2020s British game shows
British dating and relationship reality television series
ITV game shows
Television series by Hat Trick Productions
English-language television shows
2010s Australian game shows